Habib Kot Junction railway station is located in Habib Kot village, Shikarpur district of Sindh province of the Pakistan. It is the junction of Kotri - Habib Kot via Dadu and Larkana branch railway line.

See also
 List of railway stations in Pakistan
 Pakistan Railways

References

Railway stations in Shikarpur District
Railway stations on Rohri–Chaman Railway Line
Railway stations on Kotri–Attock Railway Line (ML 2)
Railway stations in Sindh